Chore is a village in Sughd Region, northern Tajikistan. It is part of the jamoat Ayni in the Ayni District. It is located near the M34 highway.

References

Populated places in Sughd Region